The Huarón mine is a large polymetallic (Zn-Pb-Ag-Cu) located in the center of Peru in Pasco Region. Huarón represents one of the largest silver reserve in Peru and in the world, having in 2013 estimated reserves of 61.3 million oz of silver.

Huarón gives the name to the Huarón Mining District that includes other important polymetallic mines.

See also 
Huarón Mining District

List of mines in Peru

Zinc mining

References 

Silver mines in Peru
Polymetallic Zn-Pb-Ag-Cu mines in Peru